Cho Dae-hyun(born August 6, 1999) is the catcher of KT Wiz of the KBO League. He graduated Yushin High School.

References

External links 

 Jo Dae-hyun on MyKBO Stats

KT Wiz players
1999 births
Living people
Baseball catchers
South Korean baseball players